George Leslie Burditt (27 February 1910 – 1981) was an English professional footballer who played as a forward. He made appearances in the English Football League for Nottingham Forest, Millwall and Wrexham

He also guested for Leeds United and Doncaster Rovers during the Second World War.

References

1910 births
1981 deaths
English footballers
Association football forwards
English Football League players
Norwich City F.C. players
Nottingham Forest F.C. players
Millwall F.C. players
Wrexham A.F.C. players
Doncaster Rovers F.C. players
Leeds United F.C. wartime guest players
Doncaster Rovers F.C. wartime guest players